Patrick James Teehan (14 April 1904 – 25 December 1985) was an Irish Fianna Fáil politician, auctioneer and farmer who served as a Senator for the Administrative Panel from 1951 to 1960 and 1965 to 1969 and a Teachta Dála (TD) for the Carlow–Kilkenny constituency from 1960 to 1961.

He was elected to Seanad Éireann as a Senator for the Administrative Panel at the 1951 Seanad election, and was re-elected to the Seanad in 1954 and 1957. He was elected to Dáil Éireann as a Fianna Fáil TD for the Carlow–Kilkenny constituency at the 1960 by-election, caused by the death of Joseph Hughes of Fine Gael. He lost his Dáil seat at the 1961 general election. He was again elected to the Seanad for the Administrative Panel at the 1965 Seanad election but lost his Seanad seat at the 1969 Seanad election.

References

1904 births
1985 deaths
Fianna Fáil TDs
Members of the 7th Seanad
Members of the 8th Seanad
Members of the 9th Seanad
Members of the 16th Dáil
Members of the 11th Seanad
Irish farmers
Fianna Fáil senators